Genius Wars is the third book of Australian author Catherine Jinks' Evil Genius series, after Evil Genius and Genius Squad. The book's tagline is "It takes a genius to fight a genius". The book is available in both Australia and the United States.

Plot summary
After abandoning a life full of deception and mistrust, fifteen-year-old Cadel has finally found his niche.  He has a proper home, good friends, and loving parents.  He's even been studying at a real university.  But he's still not safe from Prosper English, who's now a fugitive from justice and determined to smash everything that Cadel has struggled to build.  When Cadel's nearest and dearest are threatened, he must launch an all-out attack on the man he once viewed as his father.  Can Cadel track down Prosper before it's too late?  And what rules will he have to break in the process?

Reviews

References

External links

Catherine Jinks official website

2009 Australian novels
Australian science fiction novels
Australian fantasy novels
2009 science fiction novels
Children's science fiction novels
Australian young adult novels
Novels by Catherine Jinks
Allen & Unwin books
2009 children's books